Hyles chuvilini is a moth of the family Sphingidae. It is known from Mongolia, north-eastern China and adjacent areas of Russia and also farther south in China, in Shaanxi and Shandong. This species is probably much more widely distributed in northern China.

There are two generations in northern China, with adults on wing from June to September

The larvae feed on Euphorbia fischeri in Transbaikalia. Similar larvae were also found feeding on Euphorbia species in the Altai and the Yenisey River in Russia. It has also been recorded from northern China on an unspecified Euphorbiaceae species.

References

Hyles (moth)
Moths described in 1998